{{Infobox language
| name             = Akateko
| altname          = Acateco
| states           = GuatemalaMexico
| region           = HuehuetenangoChiapas
| ethnicity        = 66,000 Akateko in Guatemala (2019 census)
| speakers         =  in Guatemala
| date             = 2011 – 2019 census
| ref              = e24
| speakers2        =  in Mexico (2020 census)
| familycolor      = American
| fam1             = Mayan
| fam2             = Qʼanjobalan–Chujean
| fam3             = Qʼanjobalan
| fam4             = Kanjobal–Jacaltec
| minority         = 
| iso3             = knj
| glotto           = west2635
| glottorefname    = Akateko
| notice           = IPA
| nativename       = Kuti, q'anub'al| agency           = Instituto Nacional de Lenguas Indígenas
Academia de Lenguas Mayas de Guatemala
| script           = Latin
}}Akateko (Acateco) is a Mayan language spoken by the Akateko people primarily in the Huehuetenango Department, Guatemala in and around the municipalities of Concepción Huista, Nentón, San Miguel Acatán, San Rafael La Independencia and San Sebastián Coatán. A number of speakers also live in Chiapas, Mexico. It is a living language with 58,600 speakers in 1998, of which 48,500 live in Guatemala and the remaining in Mexico.

Akateko stems from the Q'anjob'alan branch, making it closely related to Q’anjob’al and Chuj.

 History 
Akateko was regarded as a dialect of the Qʼanjobʼal language until the 1970s, when linguists realized that it has a distinct grammar from that of Qʼanjobʼal. That it has been thought a dialect of Qʼanjobʼal is reflected in the many names Akateko has had through time. One of its primary names before it was named Akateko was Ti Western Qʼanjobʼal, but it has also been called Conob and various names including Qʼanjobʼal and the municipality where it is spoken.

Akateko is closely related to the two Mayan languages, Qʼanjobʼal and Jakaltek. The three languages together form the Qʼanjobʼal-Jakaltek sub-branch, which together with the Mochoʼ language form the Qʼanjobʼalan sub-branch, which again, together with the Chujean languages, Chuj and Tojolabʼal, form the branch Qʼanjobalan–Chujean. It is believed that Qʼanjobʼal–Jakaltek split into Akateko, Qʼanjobʼal and Jakaltek some 500 to 1,500 years ago.
 Classifiers in Akatek 
Akateko, Q’anjob’al and Chuj all utilize similar classifiers to organize nouns. Nouns are divided into three categories: humans, animals and inanimate objects and there is no generic classifier. 

Akatek has 14 nominal classifiers. 

 Grammar 
An interesting aspect of Akateko grammar, which is also present in most other Qʼanjobalan languages, is the use of directional morphemes, which appear as enclitics. These morphemes make it possible for the speaker to talk about movement and direction in space without pointing or using other gestures. Consider the stative verb  to be, which can appear as  existing inwards,  existing towards there, away from the speaker and listener and  existing from the inside out, using different enclitics.

Standard verb roots are classified in multiple categories at once.

 Phonology 
 Vowels 
Akatek has 5 vowels:

Vowel length is distinctive, so one can say that the total number of vowels is 10. These long vowels are a unique and recent sound change from Q'anjob'al.

 Consonants 
Akatek has 24 consonants, including the glottal stop:

 is realized as  word-finally,  everywhere else.
 Examples: pom  copal, xopan  hollow, sip  tick

 is realized as  word-finally,  everywhere else.
 Examples: kaapʼ  two, mooke  tinaja, chʼok  zanate

 is realized as  before plosive consonants,  everywhere else.
 Examples: teʼ  tree, satkan  sky, pʼit  song

 is realized as  word-finally,  everywhere else.
 Examples: kaapʼ  two, pʼeyʼpʼal  the walking (thing)

 is realized as  word-initially,  everywhere else.
 Examples: xos  egg, ajane  foot

 Examples: Examples: inpʼit  my song, ante  to cure, naa'''  house''

References 

Mayan languages
Mesoamerican languages
Agglutinative languages
Verb–object–subject languages
Indigenous languages of Central America
Languages of Guatemala
Huehuetenango Department
Languages of Mexico
Indigenous languages of Mexico